The 2020 Arkansas Razorbacks women's soccer team represents the University of Arkansas during the 2020 NCAA Division I women's soccer season. This season is the 35th in program history. The Razorbacks play their home games at Razorback Field in Fayetteville and are led by ninth-year head coach Colby Hale.

The Razorbacks are playing a shortened, eight-game conference-only regular season schedule in the fall due to the COVID-19 pandemic. The season began on September 19 with a home game against LSU and ended with the SEC Tournament Championship on November 22. On February 3, 2021, it was announced that Arkansas would play a six-game non-conference spring schedule, beginning on February 21 and ending April 15.

Previous season

In 2019, the Razorbacks finished the regular season 14–2–2, 8–1–1 in SEC play, winning their first regular-season SEC championship and capturing the top overall seed in the SEC Tournament, where they defeated 6-seed Ole Miss and 5-seed Florida en route to the championship game, where they fell 0–1 to 3-seed South Carolina. The Razorbacks were selected as an at-large bid to the NCAA Tournament, where they received a 3-seed and defeated North Texas in the first round of the Stanford bracket before being defeated in the second round by NC State. The Hogs finished their season with a record of 17–4–2.

Personnel

Roster

Coaching staff

Schedule
Source:

|-
!colspan=8 style=""| Fall SEC regular season

|-
!colspan=8 style=""| SEC Tournament

|-
!colspan=8 style=""| Spring non-conference regular season

|-
!colspan=8 style=""| Spring non-conference regular season

Game summaries

Fall SEC regular season

SEC Tournament

Spring non-conference regular season

Ranking movements

Fall season

Spring season

References

Arkansas
Arkansas Razorbacks women's soccer seasons
Arkansas Razorbacks soccer, women's